Trujillo is a Spanish surname that originates from the Spanish town of Trujillo in modern day Extremadura, Spain. The town of Trujillo was home to many conquistadors which is why it became widespread in the Americas. 

Notable people with the surname include:

 Alex Trujillo (born 1974), Puerto Rican boxer
 Alfonso López Trujillo (1935–2008), Colombian cardinal
 Bernardo Trujillo (1920–1971), Colombian-born American marketing executive
 César Gaviria Trujillo (born 1947), Colombian president
 Chad Trujillo (born 1973), American astronomer
 Consuelo Trujillo, Spanish actress
 David Trujillo (born c. 1976), American businessman
 Diego Trujillo (born 1960), Colombian actor
 Héctor Trujillo (1908–2002), Dominican Republic president
 Luis Trujillo (born 1977), Peruvian footballer
 Lynn Trujillo, American lawyer and government official
 María Trujillo (born 1959), Mexican–American athlete
 Mariano Trujillo (born 1977), Mexican footballer
 Rafael Trujillo (1891–1961), Dominican Republic president
 Rafael Trujillo (sailor) (born 1975), Spanish sailor
 Raoul Trujillo (born 1955), American actor
 Rigoberto Trujillo (born 1978), Cuban judoka
 Robert Trujillo (born 1964), American musician, member of Metallica
 Solomon Trujillo (born 1951), American business executive
 Stephen Trujillo, American soldier
 Tony Trujillo (born 1982), American skateboarder
 Valentin Trujillo (1951–2006), Mexican actor
 Roy Benjamin Trujillo (born 1965), American business executive
 Michael Karl Trujillo  (born 1962), American wine maker and business executive

References

Spanish toponymic surnames

Spanish-language surnames